The Battle of Fossalta was a battle of the War of the Guelphs and Ghibellines in Northern Italy. It took place in Fossalta, a small location on the Panaro River, and is especially remembered for the capture of Enzio of Sardinia, son of Emperor Frederick II of Hohenstaufen.

Prelude 
In the spring of 1249, a Guelph Romagnol army of the Lombard League advanced to the Panaro. The army was composed of 3,000 knights and 2,000-foot soldiers from the Margrave Azzo VII d'Este and 1,000 knights and 800-foot soldiers of Bolognese militias from Porta Stieri, Porta San Procolo, and Porta Ravegnana. The army was led by the Brescian Filippo Ugoni, who had victoriously defended Milan while besieged by Emperor Frederick II, and accompanied by Ottaviano degli Ubaldini, the Cardinal of Bologna.

The Guelph army threatened the Ghibelline city of Modena and therefore the Modenese had requested help from Enzio of Sardinia, who was then imperial vicar in northern Italy, and resided at Cremona.

Enzio organised a massive army of 15,000 men, composed of Imperial Germans and Lombard Ghibellines from Cremona and Modena. He led the army across the Po by using his self-constructed bridge at Bugno. They arrived at the Fossalta stream, some 5 km north of Modena.

Battle 
Both armies faced each other for days, yet none dared to attack the other. On 26 May 1249, Enzio ordered his troops to assume a formation: he split his army into three corps and positioned them into two lines. Ugoni divided his forces into four corps on a broad line. Once the 2,000 additional troops from Bologna had arrived, Ugoni charged for battle.

At dawn, the Guelph army furiously attacked Enzio. After a long struggle the Guelphs were brought to a halt, but Bolognese attacks continued all morning and all day long. The Imperial army resisted each attack, but the skirmish was fierce and bloody. By evening the Imperial line was bent and Enzio's horse was killed underneath him. The Bolognese advanced and the Imperial force started to flee. The fleeing Imperial force, who fought with the network of canals and streams in their back, were now an easy target for the Bolognese and many were killed or taken prisoner.

Aftermath 
The Bolognese had taken a lot of German and Cremonese prisoners at Fossalta; among these was Enzio. The victorious Bolognese were greeted by a fanatical crowd upon their return to Bologna. Enzio, in his full armour and decorated helmet, was put in golden chains and paraded around Bologna on a horse. He would spend his whole life in the Bolognese palace thenceforth named after him, the Palazzo Re Enzo.

The battle had no great meaning and did not change or shape the contemporary politics or map of Italy (unlike the Siege of Brescia or the Battle of Parma). But the defeat and the imprisonment of his son Enzio was a heavy blow for Emperor Frederick II. Frederick demanded the release of Enzio, but the Bolognese stood firm with their policy.

References
Lexikon des Mittelalters: Band III
Decker-Hauff Hansmartin: Band III

Notes 

Fossalta
Fossalta
1249 in Europe
1240s in the Holy Roman Empire
Fossalta
13th century in Italy
Fossalta